Opharus almopia is a moth of the family Erebidae. It was described by Herbert Druce in 1890. It is found in Colombia.

References

Opharus
Moths described in 1890
Moths of South America